A necessary evil is an evil that someone believes must be done or accepted because it is necessary to achieve a better outcome—especially because possible alternative courses of action or inaction are expected to be worse. It is the "lesser evil" in the lesser of two evils principle, which maintains that given two bad choices, the one that is least bad is the better choice.

History
The Oxford Dictionary of Word Origins asserts that "[t]he idea of a necessary evil goes back to Greek", describing the first necessary evil as marriage, and further stating that, "The first example in English, from 1547, refers to a woman". Thomas Fuller, in his 1642 work, The Holy State and the Profane State, made another of the earliest recorded uses of the phrase when he described the court jester as something that "...some count a necessary evil in a Court". In Common Sense, Thomas Paine described government as at best a "necessary evil".

Evil as a concept is defined by the fact of acts done, considered to be contrary to morality, in other words, sinful, and the execution of any act by an individual, the defining value of the act, is harm is done (in an archaic sense, this indicates acts causing repulsion or discomfort), additionally, the act is classified as, profoundly immoral.

This being true, the use of the term "evil" in the phrase does not necessarily indicate that the thing being characterized as a "necessary evil" is something that is generally considered an "evil" in the sense of being immoral or the enemy of the good. In Fuller's use of the phrase, for example, there is no implication that court jesters are evil people, or having one serves an evil end. The term is most typically used to identify something that is merely an inconvenience or annoyance. Where an author suggests that "[p]aperwork is a necessary evil, despised but handled with the understanding that a mistake – even a trivial one – could be costly". It is understood that the author is not deeming "paperwork" to be wicked, immoral, or evil in senses comparable to those. Some thinkers specifically reject the idea of anything that is actually "evil" being necessary. This may manifest as an admonition for moral people to avoid participating in the activities that are perceived as evil:

Alternately, this may manifest as a call to eliminate systems that contain aspects perceived as evil, and replace them with systems that avoid these aspects. For example, speaking of political parties in the Parliament of the United Kingdom, one author wrote:

Italian physician Fillipo Mazzei, in his correspondence with Thomas Jefferson in the 1770s, qualified a necessary evil as a restriction without which even greater evils would arise:

See also
Lesser of two evils principle

References

Sources
dictionary definition Cambridge Dictionary Accessed February 11, 2018

Necessity
Philosophical problems
Concepts in ethics
Good and evil